Diving was contested at the 1986 Asian Games in Jamsil Indoor Swimming Pool, Seoul, South Korea from September 22 to September 26, 1986.

Medalists

Men

Women

Medal table

References 

Women's Platform Results
Men's Platform Results
Women's Springboard Results
Men's Springboard Results

External links
Medals
Asian Games medalists

 
1986 Asian Games events
1986
Asian Games
1986 Asian Games
International aquatics competitions hosted by South Korea